John Bond is a New Zealand former rugby league footballer, and coach who represented New Zealand in the 1954 World Cup.

Playing career
A goalkicking prop, Bond played in the Canterbury Rugby League competition. His career spanned 22 years starting in his debut in 1947 as a 15-year-old with Papanui. He also represented Canterbury and the South Island during this period.

Bond made his debut for the New Zealand national rugby league team in 1953, kicking a goal in his debut against Australia. Bond went on to play in twenty two matches for New Zealand, including seven test matches. Bond was part of the New Zealand squad at the inaugural World Cup in 1954. He later toured Britain and France in 1955-56 and Australia in 1956.

Bond retired in 1958 but, after a three-year retirement, he returned with Marist in 1962. In 1965 he took over as the player-coach of Kaiapoi. He retired again in 1969.

References

Living people
New Zealand rugby league players
New Zealand national rugby league team players
Canterbury rugby league team players
South Island rugby league team players
Rugby league props
Papanui Tigers players
Marist-Western Suburbs players
New Zealand rugby league coaches
Northern Bulldogs players
Year of birth missing (living people)